The position of South African ambassador to the United States is the most prestigious and top diplomatic post in South Africa. The position was first held in March 1949, following the upgrade of South Africa's diplomatic mission to an embassy. The post has been held by many important politicians and is currently held by Nomaindia Mfeketo.

See also
Embassy of South Africa in Washington, D.C.

References

 
United States
South Africa